A number of steamships have been named SS Europa after the continent of Europe:

 , a 16,504-ton ocean liner in Europe—North America immigrant service in 1950–51 (formerly )
 , an ocean liner operated by the North German Lloyd 1930–1945

See also 
  for other ships with this name
 Europa (disambiguation) for other things named Europa

Ship names